Shaki Khan's Mosque, previously First Khan Mosque is an 18th-century Azerbaijani mosque located in the city of Shaki.

History 
The city of Shaki experienced an unprecedented prosperity during reign of Muhammad Husayn khan. The life of the people improved, mosques and a fortress wall were erected. One of the best architectural achievements of the reign of Muhammad Husayn khan is considered the Khan's mosque, built in 1769–70 near the market square in the Bazarbashi quarter.

Local building materials such as river stone, burnt brick, lime, ceramite, oak, hazel and poplar was used during the construction of the mosque. The mosque has an external arched gallery. The minaret, included in the general complex of the mosque, makes the architectural appearance of the mosque even more beautiful. The interior of the mosque is very simple, multi-colored windows-panels add color to the interior, and the plane plane located in the courtyard of the mosque adds a special color to the whole complex. Next to the mosque there is a cemetery with tombstones decorated with special patterns and ornaments. Shaki khans, members of their families and relatives are buried here, therefore the cemetery is called the “Khans' cemetery”.

During the Soviet era, the mosque was initially used as a warehouse and in the period from 1978 to 1994 as the “House of Intellectuals”. In 1994, local residents repaired and rebuilt the mosque. Currently, the Khan's mosque, as well as the cemetery and minaret in front of the mosque are under state protection. It was used as mosque until 2018, when it was converted to museum.

References 

Shaki, Azerbaijan
Mosques in Shaki